Gulu Military Hospital is a hospital in Gulu, in the Northern Region of Uganda.

Location
The hospital caters to UPDF personnel and their families.

See also
Bombo Military Hospital
Nakasongola Military Hospital
Mbuya Military Hospital
List of hospitals in Uganda

References

External links
 Government To Construct Shs100 Billion Military Hospital At Mbuya

Gulu Military Hospital
Gulu District
Acholi sub-region
Northern Region, Uganda